James Primadicci (early 15th century, Bologna, Signoria of Bologna (Italy) – 1460, Bologna) was a Papal diplomat who was particularly charged with sensitive attempts to bring Eastern churches back into communion with Rome.

References

1400s births
Year of birth unknown
Diplomats from Bologna
1460 deaths
Date of death unknown
Italian Franciscans